"Vox Populi" (Latin, "voice of the people") is the eleventh episode of season one of the CBS drama Jericho.

Plot 
At the beginning of the episode, a message is sent to Robert Hawkins via his basement computer, saying "Traitor Identified. Make Contact ASAP". Hawkins is about to reply when his son calls him to teach him to play football.

Dale discovers Gracie Leigh's lifeless body in a pool of blood.  Mitchell Cafferty arrives during the investigation, claiming that Jonah Prowse is the culprit, but Mayor Green is dubious. Gray Anderson heads a lynch mob and uses the town's anger for his own political gain.  Jonah shows up at Emily's house, claiming he was stabbed by Mitchell.

Jake Green pulls up to the Hawkins house, enlisting Robert's help in trying to find Jonah. They head to Emily Sullivan's house, suspecting that he would have gone there. They arrive at the same time as Gray's men, but deter Gray from searching Emily's house. Jake enters the house, and is confronted by Jonah, who claims that Mitchell is the one who killed Gracie. He then claims that Mitchell attacked him, but he was able to fight Mitchell off with a tire iron and flee.  He is bleeding heavily from his wounds, and Jake gets Dr. Dhuwalia from the bar to treat him. After his arm is bandaged, Jonah makes a break for it.

Gail tells Dale that, following the deaths of his parents, Gracie had changed her will and left the store to him. Mitchell later confronts Dale at the store, threatening  Dale  at knife point, demanding that Dale share half of the store profits. Mitchell tells Dale that if he refuses, Dale will end up just like the store's previous owner, Gracie.

Gray and his men capture Jonah after a brief chase.  Gray is elected the new mayor of Jericho after apprehending Jonah. During his inauguration speech, he declares that he will release the food that was airdropped in town, and seek "swift and sure" justice for Gracie's murderer.  After the election, he prepares to take Jonah off to be killed after being found guilty by a makeshift tribunal. Dale, Jake, and his father arrive in time to save Jonah's life, and force Gray to rethink his actions. Jonah is spared, but exiled from the town.  As he leaves, he appears to reconcile his relationship with Emily to some degree.

In celebration, Jake dances with Emily in the bar and, just as they are about to kiss, Eric calls them outside and they see a crowd of people with dirtied clothes, refugees who have walked to Jericho. Emily recognizes one of them as her missing fiancé, Roger. In an alley, Dale shoots Mitchell in the chest, then calmly walks away.

During the episode, Hawkins views another message that requests his coordinates. He is about to send them when he changes his mind and sends a message saying "Compromised.  Proceed without me." - a decision that ties back into an earlier promise to spend more time with his family and less time with his mysterious plans or helping the police. At the end of the episode, he is sent a message that says, "We need to discuss why you are lying to us."  A satellite mapping program appears and zooms in, showing an image of Hawkins holding a football, standing next to his wife, with his son nearby. A final text message says "See you soon".

Music
 Sinéad O'Connor - "Nothing Compares 2 U"

External links
"Vox Populi" at CBS.com

2006 American television episodes
Jericho (2006 TV series) episodes